Speer is an unincorporated community in Stark County, Illinois, United States, located  southeast of Wyoming. Speer has a post office with ZIP code 61479.

History
A post office called Speer has been in operation since 1902. The community was named for E. K. and E. M. Speer, the original owners of the town site.

References

Unincorporated communities in Stark County, Illinois
Unincorporated communities in Illinois
Peoria metropolitan area, Illinois